Antoniano is an Italian surname. Notable people with this name include the following:

 Giovanni Antoniano (died 1588), Dutch patristic scholar
 Silvio Antoniano (1540–1603), Italian cardinal

See also

Antoniani
Antonino (name)

Italian-language surnames
Patronymic surnames
Surnames from given names